Kazimierz Landscape Park (Kazimierski Park Krajobrazowy) is a protected area (Landscape Park) in eastern Poland, established in 1979, covering an area of .

The Park lies within Lublin Voivodeship, in Puławy County (Gmina Kazimierz Dolny).

Within the Landscape Park are two nature reserves.

References 

Kazimierz
Parks in Lublin Voivodeship